German submarine U-564 was a Type VIIC U-boat built for Nazi Germany's Kriegsmarine for service during the Second World War. The RAF sank her in the Bay of Biscay on 14 June 1943.

Construction and commissioning
She was ordered on 24 October 1939 and was laid down on 30 March 1940 at Blohm & Voss, Hamburg, as ' 540'. She was launched on 7 February 1941 and commissioned under her first commander Oberleutnant zur See Reinhard Suhren on 3 April of that year. Her chief engineer under Suhren was Ulrich Gabler. Suhren commanded her for her work-up with the 1st U-boat Flotilla between 3 April and 1 June 1941. She then became a front (operational) boat of the 1st U-boat Flotilla, and set out on her first patrols.

Design
German Type VIIC submarines were preceded by the shorter Type VIIB submarines. U-564 had a displacement of  when at the surface and  while submerged. She had two shafts and two  propellers.

U-564 was fitted with five  torpedo tubes (four fitted at the bow and one at the stern), fourteen torpedoes, one  SK C/35 naval gun, 220 rounds, and a  C/30 anti-aircraft gun. The boat had a complement of between forty-four and sixty.

Service history

Early patrols
Her first patrol took U-564 from Kiel to Brest in occupied France, spending a total of 41 days at sea. The patrol brought a number of successes; on 27 June Suhren came across convoy HX 133. He damaged the Norwegian tanker  and sank the Dutch  and the British  that day. He had one further success on that patrol, sinking the Icelandic merchantman  on 29 June.

She sailed again from Brest on 16 August, heading into the Atlantic. She came across convoy OG-71 and sank the Irish  and the British tug Empire Oak on 22 August. She sank an escort the following day, . She sailed again on 16 September, this time encountering convoy HG-75 on 24 October. U-564 was attacked later in the evening, by a bomb from an aircraft and later by an escort with depth charges. She escaped damage however, and returned to port at Lorient on 1 November having spent 47 days at sea and sunk three ships for 1,687 and 900 tons.

U-564 relocated to La Pallice in early 1942, and sailed from there on 18 January.

Off the American coast
U-564 sailed from Brest on 4 April 1942, to cross the Atlantic and prey on shipping off the North American coast, including Florida. She was in position in early May and on 3 May, secured her first success, sinking the British . On the 4 May, she damaged the British , and on 5 May she damaged the American . On 8 May she sank the American merchantman , the following day she sank the Panamanian tanker . Her final success in American waters was to sink the Mexican tanker .

U-564 repeated the exercise on her next patrol, departing Brest on 6 July to operate off the coast of South America.

Fiedler takes charge
This was Suhren's last patrol as commander of U-564. He left on 1 October to become an instructor, Oberleutnant zur See Hans Fiedler took command. He took the boat on two war patrols in 1943 but failed to hit any enemy ships. On one of these sorties events took a dramatic turn when the U-boat lost a crewman, Fähnrich zur See (Ensign) Heinrich Fuerhake. U-564 was transferred to operate out of Bordeaux in April 1943. A Royal Air Force Short Sunderland spotted the boats and attacked them off Cape Finisterre at 18.59 hours on 13 June. The aircraft targeted U-564 and dropped its bombs, but was shot down by anti-aircraft fire, killing all 11 of the crew. U-564 had sustained heavy damage and turned back, escorted by U-185.

Wolfpacks
U-564 took part in six wolfpacks, namely:
 Brandenburg (16 – 19 September 1941) 
 Breslau (2 – 29 October 1941) 
 Natter (2 – 8 November 1942) 
 Westwall (8 – 16 December 1942) 
 Seeteufel (21 – 30 March 1943) 
 Löwenherz (1 – 10 April 1943)

Sinking
An Armstrong Whitworth Whitley sighted the two U-boats in the Bay of Biscay the following day and shadowed them. U-564 was unable to dive due to the damage already sustained. By 16:45 hours the Whitley was running low on fuel and attacked U-564. The two U-boats damaged their attacker with anti-aircraft fire but the aircraft's depth charges fatally damaged U-564 and she sank at 17:30 hours. The damaged Whitley was forced to ditch, where a French trawler rescued the crew. There were 18 survivors from U-564 including the commander.  picked them up and transferred them to the  two hours later.

Summary of raiding history

References

Notes

Citations

Bibliography

External links

German Type VIIC submarines
U-boats commissioned in 1941
U-boats sunk in 1943
World War II submarines of Germany
World War II shipwrecks in the Atlantic Ocean
1941 ships
Ships built in Hamburg
U-boats sunk by British aircraft
U-boats sunk by depth charges
Maritime incidents in June 1943